Răzvan Sabău defeated Jimy Szymanski in the final, 6–1, 6–3 to win the boys' singles tennis title at the 1993 Wimbledon Championships.

Seeds

  Neville Godwin (second round)
  Paul Goldstein (first round)
  Lars Burgsmüller (quarterfinals)
  Lars Rehmann (third round)
  Filip Kaščák (first round)
  Nicolas Escudé (semifinals)
  Jimy Szymanski (final)
  Steven Downs (second round)
  Răzvan Sabău (champion)
  James Sekulov (second round)
  Gustavo Kuerten (third round)
  Sebastián Prieto (first round)
  Dennis van Scheppingen (second round)
  Franco Squillari (first round)
  James Baily (second round)
  Jason Appel (quarterfinals)

Draw

Finals

Top half

Section 1

Section 2

Bottom half

Section 3

Section 4

References

External links

Boys' Singles
Wimbledon Championship by year – Boys' singles